Vaux-sur-Lunain (literally Vaux on Lunain) is a commune in the Seine-et-Marne department, Île-de-France, north central France.

Geography
The commune is traversed by the Lunain river.

Demographics
Inhabitants of Vaux-sur-Lunain are called Vaulxois.

See also
Communes of the Seine-et-Marne department

References

Communes of Seine-et-Marne